Cymindis ehlersi is a species of ground beetle in the subfamily Harpalinae. It was described by Jules Putzeys in 1872.

References

ehlersi
Beetles described in 1872